Subbotin or Subotin (masculine, Cyrillic: Субботин, Суботин) and Subbotina or Subotina (feminine, Cyrillic: Субботина, Суботина) is a Russian surname originating from the Slavic name Subbota or Subota. Originally this name was given to a boy who was born on Saturday (Russian: Суббота). The surname may refer to the following notable people:

Aleksandr Subbotin (born 1991), Russian footballer
Andrei Subbotin (born 1973), Russian ice hockey player
Igor Subbotin (born 1990), Estonian footballer
Mikhail Subbotin (1893–1966), Soviet astronomer
Subbotin (crater), lunar crater
1692 Subbotina, main-belt asteroid named after Mikhail Subbotin
Milan Subotin (born 1984), Serbian politician
Pyotr Subbotin-Permyak (1886–1923), Russian avant-guardist painter
Serafim Subbotin (1921–1996), Soviet pilot
Sergey Subbotin (born 1955), Russian politician

See also
Subota (disambiguation)
Subbotin oil field, a continental shelf oil field in Ukraine

References

Russian-language surnames